The 2010 Camparini Gioielli Cup was a professional tennis tournament played on outdoor red clay courts. It was part of the 2010 ATP Challenger Tour. It took place in Reggio Emilia, Italy between 21 and 27 June 2010.

ATP entrants

Seeds

 Rankings are as of June 14, 2010.

Other entrants
The following players received wildcards into the singles main draw:
  Flavio Cipolla
  Thomas Fabbiano
  Federico Gaio
  Daniele Giorgini

The following players received entry from the qualifying draw:
  Alberto Brizzi
  Ricardo Hocevar
  Martin Slanar
  Walter Trusendi

Champions

Singles

 Carlos Berlocq def.  Pablo Andújar, 6–0, 7–6(1).

Doubles

 Philipp Oswald /  Martin Slanar def.  Sadik Kadir /  Purav Raja, 6–2, 5–7, [10–6].

References
Official website
ITF search 

Camparini Gioielli Cup
Clay court tennis tournaments
Camparini Gioielli Cup
2010 in Italian tennis